Paku Alam I, originally known as Natakusuma, was the first Duke (Adipati) of Pakualaman, rewarded for helping the British quell conflict in Yogyakarta in June 1812. Pakualaman became a small hereditary Duchy within the Sultanate of Yogyakarta, as a mirror-image of the Duchy of Mangkunegaran within the territory of the Susuhunanate of Surakarta. Paku Alam I ruled from 1812 to 1829, and was buried at Kota Gede.

Subsequent list of rulers
 Paku Alam II, 1829 – 1858
 Paku Alam III, 1858 – 1864
 Paku Alam IV, 1864 – 1878
 Paku Alam V, 1878 – 1900
 Paku Alam VI, 1901 – 1902
 Paku Alam VII, 1903 – 1938
 Paku Alam VIII, 1938 – 1999
 Paku Alam IX, 1999 – 2015
 Paku Alam X, 2016 –

Notes

1829 deaths
Dukes of Pakualaman
Pakualaman
Burials at Kotagede
19th-century Indonesian people
Indonesian royalty